Francisco de Paula López de Castro (1771–1827) was a Spanish Neoclassic poet and writer.

Spanish male writers
1771 births
1827 deaths